The Accrediting Council for Continuing Education and Training is a private, non-profit organization in the United States that provides national accreditation to private, post-secondary educational institutions offering non-collegiate vocational, avocational and English-language training which may be approved to award validated CEUs, certificates and/or an Occupational Associates Degree. The organization's headquarters are located in Washington, DC. 

ACCET has been recognized by the United States Department of Education as an independent accrediting agency since 1978.

References

External links
 

Higher education accreditation
Higher education in the United States
Healthcare accreditation organizations in the United States